Bearden is a surname. Notable people with the surname include:

Gene Bearden (1920–2004), American baseball player
Milton Bearden (born 1940s), American intelligence officer, author, and film consultant
Romare Bearden (1911–1988), African-American artist